Journey's End is a 1930 war film directed by James Whale. Based on the play of the same name by R. C. Sherriff, the film tells the story of several British army officers involved in trench warfare during the First World War. The film, like the play before it, was an enormous critical and commercial success and launched the film careers of Whale and several of its stars.

The following year there was a German film version The Other Side directed by Heinz Paul starring Conrad Veidt as Stanhope and Wolfgang Liebeneiner as Raleigh. The film was banned just weeks after the Nazis took power in 1933.

In 1976, the play was adapted again as Aces High with the scenario shifted to the British Royal Flying Corps. The play was adapted for film again with its original title and scenario in 2017.

Plot
On the eve of a battle in 1918, a new officer, Second Lieutenant Raleigh (David Manners), joins Captain Stanhope's (Colin Clive) company in the British trench lines in France. The two men knew each other at school: the younger Raleigh hero-worshipping Stanhope, while Stanhope has come to love Raleigh's sister. But the Stanhope whom Raleigh encounters now is a changed man who, after three years at the front, has turned to drink and seems close to a breakdown.

Stanhope is terrified that Raleigh will betray his decline to his sister, whom he hopes to marry after the war.  An older officer, the avuncular Lieutenant Osborne (Ian Maclaren), desperately tries to keep Stanhope from cracking. Osborne and Raleigh are selected to lead a raiding party on the German trenches where a number of the raiders are killed, including Osborne.  Later, when Raleigh, too, is mortally wounded, Stanhope faces a desperate time as, grief-stricken and without close friends, he prepares to face another furious enemy attack.

Cast
 Colin Clive as Captain Denis Stanhope
 Ian Maclaren  as Lieutenant Osborne
 David Manners as Second Lieutenant Raleigh
 Billy Bevan as Second Lieutenant Trotter
 Anthony Bushell as Second Lieutenant Hibbert
 Robert Adair as Captain Hardy
 Charles K. Gerrard as Private Mason
 Tom Whiteley as Sergeant Major
 Jack Pitcairn as Colonel
 Werner Klingler as German prisoner
 Gil Perkins as Sergeant Cox
 Leslie Sketchley as Corporal Ross

Production
When Howard Hughes made the decision to turn Hell's Angels into a talkie, he hired a then-unknown James Whale, who had just arrived in Hollywood following a successful turn directing the play Journey's End in London and on Broadway, to direct the talking sequences; it was Whale's film debut, and arguably prepared him for the later success he would have with the feature version of Journey's End, Waterloo Bridge, and, most famously, the 1931 version of Frankenstein. Unhappy with the script, Whale brought in Joseph Moncure March to re-write it. Hughes later gave March the Luger pistol used in the film.

With production delayed while Hughes tinkered with the flying scenes in Hell's Angels, Whale managed to shoot his film adaptation of Journey's End and have it come out a month before Hell's Angels was released. The gap between completion of the dialogue scenes and completion of the aerial combat stunts allowed Whale to be paid, sail back to England, and begin work on the subsequent project, making Whale's actual (albeit uncredited) cinema debut, his "second" film to be released.

References
Notes

Bibliography

 Curtis, James. James Whale: A New World of Gods and Monsters. Boston: Faber and Faber,1998. .
 Dolan, Edward F. Jr. Hollywood Goes to War. London: Bison Books, 1985. .
 Hardwick, Jack and Ed Schnepf.  "A Viewer's Guide to Aviation Movies". The Making of the Great Aviation Films, General Aviation Series, Volume 2, 1989.
 Orriss, Bruce. When Hollywood Ruled the Skies: The Aviation Film Classics of World War II. Hawthorne, California: Aero Associates Inc., 1984. .
 Osborne, Robert. 65 Years of the Oscar: The Official History of the Academy Awards London: Abbeville Press, 1994. .
 "Production of 'Hell's Angels' Cost the Lives of Three Aviators." Syracuse Herald, 28 December 1930, p. 59.
 Robertson, Patrick. Film Facts. New York: Billboard Books, 2001. .

External links

 Journey's End at the Internet Movie Database

1930 films
1930s war drama films
British war drama films
American war drama films
1930s English-language films
Films directed by James Whale
Films set in 1918
Western Front (World War I) films
American films based on plays
1930 directorial debut films
Gainsborough Pictures films
Tiffany Pictures films
American black-and-white films
1930 drama films
1930s American films
1930s British films